The 1993 Amway Classic was a women's tennis tournament played on outdoor hard courts at the ASB Tennis Centre in Auckland in New Zealand that was part of Tier IV of the 1993 WTA Tour. It was the eighth edition of the tournament and was held from 1 February through 7 February 1993. Unseeded Elna Reinach won the singles title and earned $18,000 first prize money.

Finals

Singles

 Elna Reinach defeated  Caroline Kuhlman 6–0, 6–0
 It was Reinach's only WTA title of her career.

Doubles

 Isabelle Demongeot /  Elna Reinach defeated   Jill Hetherington /  Kathy Rinaldi 6–2, 6–4

Prize money 

* per team

See also
 1993 Benson and Hedges Open – men's tournament

References

External links
 ITF tournament edition details

Amway Classic
WTA Auckland Open
AM
ASB
1993 in New Zealand tennis